The 1987 Tokyo Indoor also known as "Seiko Super Tennis" was a men's tennis tournament played on indoor carpet courts at the Yoyogi National Gymnasium in Tokyo, Japan that was part of the 1987 Nabisco Grand Prix. The tournament was held from 20 October through 24 October 1987. It was a major tournament of the Grand Prix tennis circuit and  matches were the best of three sets. Stefan Edberg won the singles title.

Finals

Singles

 Stefan Edberg defeated  Ivan Lendl 6–7(4–7), 6–4, 6–4
 It was Edberg's 6th singles title of the year and the 14th of his career.

Doubles

 Broderick Dyke /  Tom Nijssen defeated  Sammy Giammalva, Jr. /  Jim Grabb 6–3, 6–2

References

External links
 ITF tournament edition details

Tokyo Indoor
Tokyo Indoor
Tokyo Indoor